KLVX (channel 10) is a PBS member television station in Las Vegas, Nevada, United States. Owned by the Clark County School District, it is the flagship outlet of the district's communications arm, the KLVX Communications Group. KLVX's studios are located at the Vegas PBS Educational Technology Campus in Paradise, and its transmitter is located atop Black Mountain, near Henderson (southwest of I-515/US 93/US 95).

History 

In 1964, following the authorization of federal matching grants for the construction of non-commercial educational television facilities, the Clark County School Trustees proposed a state network of educational television stations offering television programming originating in Las Vegas. The proposal was vigorously opposed by educators in other communities, and in 1966, the school trustees gave up the proposal of a statewide service. The Trustees then sought and received Federal Communications Commission (FCC) approval to construct a single educational station in Las Vegas. The channel 10 allocation was originally assigned to Bakersfield, California; KERO-TV occupied channel 10 from its sign-on in September 1953 until it was moved to channel 23 in the summer of 1963 after the FCC decided to make the Bakersfield and Fresno markets all-UHF via the deintermixture process.

KLVX first signed on the air as Nevada's first educational station on March 25, 1968; this made the Las Vegas market the smallest market in the nation at the time to have five television stations. The state would not receive another educational station until Reno's KNPB signed on in 1983. Channel 10 originally operated from two converted classrooms located at the Southern Nevada Vocational Technical Center in Las Vegas. Students were involved in all engineering and production operations as part of a vocational training program of the School District.

In September 1968, the station activated four Instructional Television Fixed Service (ITFS) channels which offered live instructional television programs produced by the station covering foreign language, math and fine arts. Between 1978 and 1996, sixteen other ITFS channels were activated to provide 67,000 hours a year of instructional television programming, career professional development, college courses and staff orientations serving schools in the communities of Las Vegas, Henderson, North Las Vegas, Boulder City and Pahrump. In 1971, Charlotte Hill convened a group of community leaders who eventually founded Channel 10 Friends, a 501(c)3 non-profit corporation established to raise private support for KLVX's non-instructional programs, and encourage community viewing of channel 10. The organization renamed itself Southern Nevada Public Television in 2002 when the group assumed leadership of a $64 million campaign to fund digital television conversion and a new building for the station's studio facilities.

Expansion of KLVX's viewing area continued through the 1970s and 1980s throughout Clark, Lincoln, Nye and White Pine counties with construction of a network of 19 translator stations that repeat KLVX's programming for viewers in a four state,  service area. Some translators are operated by the station, but others are operated by counties or rural translator districts that rely on voluntary support.

In 1976, CCSD School Superintendent and future Nevada Governor Kenny Guinn proposed that a new building be constructed to house KLVX's operations. The proposal was adopted by the School Trustees and the Murray Peterson Public Television Center was dedicated in 1978. The facility was designed for 35 employees and student vocational training using "state of the art" film production and development processes.

In 2004, KLVX became the first station in the United States to demonstrate what digital television has to offer in times of emergency. That demonstration and the follow on technology led to the Digital Emergency Alert System (DEAS). During 2007, using $1.2 million, KLVX installed equipment to broadcast DEAS data, including the ability to do so for up to seven days without external power. The grant also covers the installation of digital television data receivers in 120 Clark County School District Police Department vehicles.

In September 2006, KLVX rebranded as "Vegas PBS" to reflect its current multiple-channel offerings and diversified multimedia services provided to the Las Vegas metropolitan area and statewide schools, in addition to its regular programming on its main channel. In 2009, KLVX moved its operations from the Channel 10 Drive building to the  Vegas PBS Educational Technology Campus. The new facility houses the KLVX studios, the Clark County School District's Virtual High School and Educational Media Center and the Homeland Security and Emergency Response support system. The facility is also the first in the United States to meet the Media Security and Reliability Council's guidelines.

Technical information

Subchannels 
The station's digital signal is multiplexed:

KLVX also operates two additional services, Vegas PBS Rewind and Vegas PBS Jackpot!, as cable-only channels, in addition to distributing the World Channel in the market in the same manner. However, both Vegas PBS Rewind and Vegas PBS Jackpot! will no longer be available on cable after May 31, 2022.

Analog-to-digital conversion 
KLVX shut down its analog signal, over VHF channel 10, on June 12, 2009, the official date in which full-power television stations in the United States transitioned from analog to digital broadcasts under federal mandate. The station's digital signal remained on its pre-transition VHF channel 11. Through the use of PSIP, digital television receivers display the station's virtual channel as its former VHF analog channel 10.

Translators

References

External links 

 

PBS member stations
LVX
Television channels and stations established in 1968
1968 establishments in Nevada
Clark County School District